Fate mapping is a method used in developmental biology to study the embryonic origin of various adult tissues and structures. The "fate" of each cell or group of cells is mapped onto the embryo, showing which parts of the embryo will develop into which tissue. When carried out at single-cell resolution, this process is called cell lineage tracing. It is also used to trace the development of tumors.

History
The earliest fate maps were based on direct observation of the embryos of ascidians or other marine invertebrates. Modern fate mapping began in 1929 when Walter Vogt marked the groups of cells using a dyed agar chip and tracked them through gastrulation. In 1978, horseradish peroxidase (HRP) was introduced as a marker. HRP was more effective than previous markers, but required embryos to be fixed before viewing. Genetic fate mapping is a technique developed in 1981 which uses a site-specific recombinase to track cell lineage genetically. Today, fate mapping is an important tool in many fields of biology research, such as developmental biology, stem cell research, and kidney research.

Cell lineage 

Fate mapping and cell lineage are similar but distinct topics, although there is often overlap. For example, the development of the complete cell lineage of C. elegans can be described as the fate maps of each cell division stacked hierarchically.  The distinction between the topics is in the type of information included. Fate mapping shows which tissues come from which part of the embryo at a certain stage in development, whereas cell lineage shows the relationships between cells at each division. A cell lineage can be used to generate a fate map, and in cases like C. elegans, successive fate mapping is used to develop a cell lineage.

Method
Fate mapping is accomplished by inserting a heritable genetic mark into a cell. Typically, this is a fluorescent protein. Therefore, any progeny of the cell will have this genetic mark. It can also be done through the use of molecular barcodes, which are introduced to the cell by retroviruses.

See also
 Cell fate determination

References

External links 
http://worms.zoology.wisc.edu/frogs/gast/gast_fatemap.html
Fate-Mapping Technique: Using Carbocyanine Dyes for Vital Labeling of Cells in Gastrula-Stage Mouse Embryos Cultured in Vitro

Developmental biology
Molecular biology techniques